Giles de Badlesmere, 2nd Baron Badlesmere (18 October 1314 – 7 June 1338) was an English nobleman.

Background and Biography
The son and heir of Bartholomew de Badlesmere, 1st Baron Badlesmere and his wife Margaret de Clare, he was born at Hambleton, Rutland.

Giles' father was executed in April 1322 for having participated in the Earl of Lancaster's rebellion against King Edward II of England. After Bartholomew had joined the rebels, his wife and their children were arrested and sent to the Tower of London because she refused to admit the Queen consort Isabella to Leeds Castle which had been granted to Bartholomew. His title and estates were attainted, therefore Giles did not immediately succeed to the barony on his father's death.

In November 1328, Giles obtained a reversal of the attainder and succeeded by writ of summons as the 2nd Baron Badlesmere. However, when he died in June 1338, the barony of Badlesmere fell into abeyance as his marriage to Elizabeth Montagu had not produced children.

Property
Records of numerous inquisitions post mortem that were held in the summer of 1338 demonstrate that Giles' extensive possessions were to be found in London, Kent and 13 other counties as well as Ireland. Apart from the assets reserved to his widow, Giles' estates went to his four sisters as coheirs. The evidence given at each hearing rested on local knowledge and there were some inconsistencies about the names of the sisters and their precise ages. However, taken as a whole, it is clear from the inquisition records that the names of the sisters were as follows, listed in descending order of age: 
Margery de Badlesmere, married William de Ros, 2nd Baron de Ros, then Thomas de Arundel
Maud de Badlesmere, married John de Vere, 7th Earl of Oxford
Elizabeth de Badlesmere, married Sir Edmund Mortimer, then William de Bohun, 1st Earl of Northampton
Margaret de Badlesmere, married John Tiptoft, 2nd Baron Tibetot

Ancestry

Notes

References
 Leigh Rayment's Peerage page
Rev. Charles J Robinson, A History of the mansions and manors of Herefordshire (1878 1st edition) reprint Logaston Press 2001. pp. 216, 250 and passim.
Paul Doherty, Queen Isabella of France and the Strange Death of Edward II (London, 2001)
Michael Prestwich, The Three Edwards: the state of war in England, 1272-1377 (Routledge, 2007)
Michael Prestwich, Plantagenet England
Ian Mortimer, Roger Mortimer, First Earl of March, Ruler of England 1327-1330, (London, 2005)
Ian Mortimer, Edward III: The Perfect King (London, 2007), Appendix II.

External links
 Inquisition Post Mortem #185, dated 1338-9.

1314 births
1338 deaths
2
Prisoners in the Tower of London
People from Rutland
People from Badlesmere, Kent